Russell Green may refer to:
Russell Green (cricketer) (born 1959), English cricketer
Russell Green (footballer) (1933–2012), English footballer
Russell Harry Coleman Green (1908–1975), English organist and composer

See also
Russell Greene (born 1957), Australian rules footballer